Circotettix coconino, the coconino wrangler grasshopper, is a species of band-winged grasshopper in the family Acrididae. It is found in North America.

References

Oedipodinae
Articles created by Qbugbot
Insects described in 1921